Malcha Mahal, also known as Wilayat Mahal, is a Tughlak era hunting lodge in the Chanakyapuri area of New Delhi, India next to the Delhi Earth Station of the Indian Space Research Organisation. It was built by Firuz Shah Tughlaq, who reigned over the Sultanate of Delhi, in 1325. It came to be known as Wilayat Mahal after the self-proclaimed "Begum Wilayat Mahal" of Awadh, who claimed to be a member of the Royal family of Oudh and was reportedly given the place by the Government of India in May 1985. On 10 September 1993, Wilayat died by suicide at the age of 62. The descendants of Wazid Ali Shah in Lucknow claim that the family engaged in fraudulent activities, having been cited by an investigative journalist for the New York Times.

The building is now mostly in ruins. After Wilayat's death, it continued to be inhabited by the Begum's daughter Sakina Mahal, and son Prince Ali Raza (aka Cyrus). Cyrus died in late 2017; his sister died some years before him, though the exact date is unknown.

History
Malcha Mahal is located in Malcha, one of the historical villages around Raisina Hill. Malcha, along with Raisina, Todapur, Aliganj, Pillanji, Jaisinghpura, and Kushak villages were moved by the British during the construction of capital New Delhi in the 1920s, especially the Viceroy's House, which is now known as the Rashtrapati Bhavan.

Inhabitation by Wilayat Mahal

Begum Wilayat Mahal, self-proclaimed great-granddaughter of the last Nawab of Awadh, Wajid Ali Shah, was reportedly allotted the Mahal in May 1985, following the intervention of the Prime Minister of India, Indira Gandhi in 1984. Begum Wilayat Mahal had been protesting for nine years by living in a waiting room at the New Delhi railway station, demanding compensation for the loss of her ancestral property in Awadh which was seized when Wajid Ali Shah's kingdom was annexed by the British. Begum Wilayat Mahal died by suicide in October 1993 and was survived by her two children.

On 22 November 2019, the New England Bureau Chief of The New York Times, Ellen Barry, published a lengthy piece of investigative journalism in which she said she had discovered that Wilayat, in fact, had no connection to the Awadh royal family. Rather, she was the widow of the former Registrar of Lucknow University, Inayatullah Butt. Barry found her oldest son, Shahid Butt, living in the UK and he had told her the true story.

Possibility of restoration
In late October of 2019, it was reported that INTACH has proposed to undertake restoration of Malcha Mahal.

See also
 Kushak Mahal, another hunting lodge of Feroz Shah Tughlaq in Delhi
 Hastsal, the hunting lodge of Shahjahan in Delhi

Bibliography

References

External links
 1986 LA Times Report after Begum moved in Malcha Mahal
 1998 NYT report after Begum died
 BBC 2017 story on the residents of Malcha mahal
 The story of other disadvantaged and displaced Malcha residents: Jats of Malcha after 104 years still await compensation for their Rashtrapati Bhawan land
The Story of Malcha Mahal
 

Buildings and structures completed in the 14th century
Buildings and structures in Delhi
History of Delhi
Awadh
Tughlaq dynasty
Delhi Sultanate